Toms Cove is an embayment on the southern end of Assateague Island in Virginia with the mouth near Chincoteague Inlet. A U.S. Coast Guard station was located there. Toms Cove also contains the Toms Cove Visitor Center run by the U.S. National Park Service.

Notes

Coves of the United States
Bodies of water of Accomack County, Virginia
Bays of Virginia